Chris or Christopher Miller may refer to:

Arts and entertainment
Chris Miller (writer) (born 1942), American comedy author and screenwriter
Chris Miller (animator) (born 1968), American voice actor and director
Christopher Miller (filmmaker) (born 1975), American filmmaker
Chris J. Miller (born 1983), American actor, writer, director and composer in horror and other genres
YC (rapper) (Christopher Miller, born 1985), American rapper
Chris Miller, English lead guitarist in the rock band You Me at Six

Sports
Chris Miller (quarterback) (born 1965), American football coach and former NFL quarterback
Chris Miller (wide receiver) (born 1973), American football player
Chris Miller (cricketer), New Zealand cricketer
Chris Miller (racing driver) (born 1989), American racing driver

Others
Christopher J. Miller (1916–?), English academic, head of The Doon School 1966 to 1970
Chris Miller (politician) (born 1954), American farmer and politician in Illinois
Christopher C. Miller (born 1965), American politician, former acting Secretary of Defense

See also
 Christopher Millar (disambiguation)